Bellaspira minutissima is a species of sea snail, a marine gastropod mollusc in the family Drilliidae.

Description
The size of an adult shell attains 50 mm.

Distribution
This species occurs off the Bahamas

References

 Fallon P.J. (2016). Taxonomic review of tropical western Atlantic shallow water Drilliidae (Mollusca: Gastropoda: Conoidea) including descriptions of 100 new species. Zootaxa. 4090(1): 1–363

External links
 

minutissima
Gastropods described in 2016